Giochi Preziosi S.p.A. also known as Gruppo Giochi Preziosi (Giochi Preziosi Group) is an Italian company that produces toys and TV series based on their toys. They work in association with Marathon Media and Mondo TV.

Giochi Preziosi is the principal owner of the Gormiti and Dinofroz franchises and license toys for other companies such as Marvel Comics, Power Rangers, Ben 10 and Winx Club toys. In 2006, they started to produce TV series based on their toys. The first series was Gormiti: The Lords of Nature Returns!. They have also produced video games based on the Gormiti TV series for the Nintendo Wii and Nintendo DS.

History 
Giochi Preziosi sold 50% stake of a joint venture Prenatal Retail Group to its partner Artsana in 2017. In the same year, Enrico Preziosi, chairman of Giochi Preziosi, bought back the minority ownership of the company from a Chinese company Ocean Gold Global.
In 2011, Flair one of UK's top ten toy companies, was acquired becoming part of the group.
Ocean Gold Global invested in Giochi Preziosi in 2014.

Toys produced 
Cicciobello
Dinofroz
Gormiti
Huntik
Puppy in My Pocket

Films 
The Lion King (2011-2019)

Television series 
Gormiti: The Invincible Lords of Nature,  Marathon Media and Canal J (2008–2009)
Gormiti: The Supreme Eclipse Era, Marathon Media and Canal J ( 2009–2010)
Gormiti The Neorganic Evolution, Marathon Media and Canal J (2010–2011)
The Land Before Time (2011-2015)
Puppy in My Pocket: Adventures in Pocketville, Mondo TV and other production companies (2011–2012)
Gormiti Nature Unleashed, Mondo TV (2012–present)
Dinofroz, Mondo TV (2012–present)
Idol x Warrior Miracle Tunes!, Boing (2018–present)
''Gormiti: The Legend Is Back (2018–2019)

Subsidiaries 
 Flair Leisure Products

References

External links 
  

Toy companies of Italy
Manufacturing companies based in Milan
Mass media in Milan
Toy companies established in 1978
Italian companies established in 1978